Iván Smith (born 23 November 1999) is an Argentine professional footballer who plays as a midfielder for Estudiantes de Buenos Aires, on loan from Godoy Cruz.

Club career
Smith's first club was Quilmes. His opening experience of first-team football arrived in December 2017, with the midfielder appearing as a substitute for a Primera B Nacional loss to Instituto on 2 December; though he wasn't chosen by manager Leonardo Lemos. On 21 January 2019, Smith was signed by Primera División side Godoy Cruz for £103k; signing a four-year contract. Seven days after sitting on the bench for a Copa Argentina encounter with Deportivo Armenio, Smith made his professional debut in a league win over Patronato on 30 March.

International career
In 2018, Smith trained with the Argentina U20s; notably against the seniors at the FIFA World Cup in Russia.

Career statistics
.

References

External links

1999 births
Living people
People from Berazategui Partido
Argentine footballers
Argentine expatriate footballers
Association football midfielders
Argentine Primera División players
Chilean Primera División players
Quilmes Atlético Club footballers
Godoy Cruz Antonio Tomba footballers
Cobresal footballers
Estudiantes de Buenos Aires footballers
Argentine expatriate sportspeople in Chile
Expatriate footballers in Chile
Sportspeople from Buenos Aires Province